The 2009 Dutch Figure Skating Championships took place between 19 and 21 December 2008 in Heerenveen. Skaters competed in the disciplines of men's singles, ladies' singles, pair skating, and synchronized skating across the levels of senior, junior, novice, and the pre-novice level debs.

Senior results

Men

Ladies

Synchronized

Junior results

Men

Ladies

Pairs

Novice results

Men

Ladies

Pairs

Synchronized

Debs results

Men

Ladies

External links
 2009 Dutch Championships results

Dutch Figure Skating Championships
Dutch Figure Skating Championships, 2009
2008 in figure skating
2009 in Dutch sport